Ricardo Mello was the defending champion, and won in the final over Eduardo Schwank, 6-3, 6-1.

Seeds

  Marcos Daniel (first round)
  Nicolás Massú (first round)
  Eduardo Schwank (final)
  Thiago Alves (semifinals)
  Sebastián Decoud (first round)
  Ricardo Mello (champion)
  Carlos Salamanca (first round)
  Júlio Silva (second round)

Draw

Finals

Top half

Bottom half

External links
Main Draw
Qualifying Draw

Prime Cup Aberto de Sao Paulo - Singles
2010 - Singles
2010 in Brazilian tennis